Periestola is a genus of beetles in the family Cerambycidae. It was described by Stephan von Breuning in 1943.

Species 
Periestola contains the following species:

 Periestola armata (Monné & Delfino, 1986)
 Periestola howdenorum (Corbett, 2004)
 Periestola mazai Santos-Silva, Nascimento, Botero & McClarin, 2021
 Periestola raphaeli (Monné & Monné, 2017)
 Periestola strandi Breuning, 1943
 Periestola wappesi (Corbett, 2004)

References

Beetles described in 1943
Cerambycidae genera
Acanthocinini